Herbert Lumsden (1897–1945) was a British Army lieutenant general. General Lumsden may also refer to:

Frederick Lumsden (1872–1918), Royal Marines brigadier general
Harry Burnett Lumsden (1821–1896), British Bengal Army lieutenant general
James Lumsden (military officer) (1598–1660), Scottish lieutenant general
Peter Lumsden (1829–1918), British Indian Army general